Brolin is a surname, most commonly occurring in Sweden. Notable people with the surname include:

 Anna Brolin (born 1980), Swedish sports reporter and sport-television presenter
 James Brolin (born 1940), American actor, producer, and director
 Josh Brolin (born 1968), American actor
 Tomas Brolin (born 1969), Swedish professional football player